GKB Optic is an Indian retailer of optical products, and operates a chain of retail stores in India. The company was founded by Brijendra Kumar Gupta. Headquartered in Kolkata, the company has over 70 stores across India and employs over 600 people. In 1959, the company set up its first retail outlet in Gariahat, Kolkata, which is one of the flagship stores of the company. The company has grown to include a retail chain of outlets, specializing in eyewear.

The company works with brands Rayban, Chanel, O2 Optix creating eyeglasses, sunglasses, disposable contact lenses, & colored contact lenses

References

External links 
 
 GKB Optic

Retail companies of India
Eyeware retailers of India
Indian companies established in 1959
Retail companies established in 1959
Eyewear companies of India
Companies based in Kolkata
1959 establishments in West Bengal